Anthony Oakley (born August 16, 1981) is a former American football guard. He was signed by the Cleveland Browns as an undrafted free agent in 2004. He played college football at Western Kentucky.

Oakley has also been a member of the Frankfurt Galaxy, Chicago Bears, Arizona Cardinals, Kansas City Chiefs, and Houston Texans.

External links
Just Sports Stats
Chicago Bears bio
Houston Texans bio

1981 births
Living people
People from Houston
American football offensive guards
Indiana Hoosiers football players
Western Kentucky Hilltoppers football players
Cleveland Browns players
Frankfurt Galaxy players
Chicago Bears players
Arizona Cardinals players
Kansas City Chiefs players
Houston Texans players
Las Vegas Locomotives players